Patrick J. Stover (born 1964) is an American nutrition scientist who researches B vitamins. He is a fellow of the American Association for the Advancement of Science and a member of the National Academy of Sciences. He has been co-editor of the Annual Review of Nutrition since 2015.

Early life and education
Patrick J. Stover was born in 1964 to parents Katherine Hanlon and William Stover. His father, William H. Stover, was a decorated WWII veteran. As a Private First Class in the 1st Marine Division, he was awarded the Silver Star from the president of the United States “for conspicuous gallantry and intrepidity during action against enemy Japanese forces on Guadalcanal, Solomon Islands on November 3, 1942".

Stover grew up in rural Pennsylvania and he and his siblings were first generation college students. He attended Saint Joseph's University in Pennsylvania, graduating with a bachelor's degree in chemistry in 1986. He then graduated from VCU Medical Center in 1990 with a PhD in biochemistry and molecular biophysics.

Career
Much of Stover's research centers on the B vitamins folate, vitamin B12 and riboflavin. Following the completion of his PhD, Stover had two postdoctoral appointments. The first was at VCU Medical Center from 1990 to 1991 with his PhD advisor Verne Schirch. Next, he went to the University of California, Berkeley to work with Barry Shane from 1992 to 1994. He was hired at Cornell University as an assistant professor in the nutritional sciences division in 1994 and was appointed to associate professor in 2000. In 2005, he was promoted once more to professor. In 2018, he was hired to serve as the Vice Chancellor and Dean for the College of Agriculture and Life Sciences at Texas A&M University and director of Texas A&M AgriLife Research. He has been co-editor of the Annual Review of Nutrition since 2015.

He has made several fundamental discoveries by identifying new pathways in the field of folate biochemistry. These discoveries include identification of the pathway for the synthesis of 5-formyltetrahydrfolate, otherwise known as lucovorin, the regulation of folate metabolism by iron, the presence of de novo thymidylate biosynthesis in mitochondria including discovery of a novel isozyme of dihydrofolate reductase, and the role of sumoylation in nuclear folate metabolism. His research group also identified impaired de novo thymidylate biosynthesis in the etiology of folic acid-responsive neural tube defects including spina bifida in mouse models. He has participated on many panels and expert committees related to folic acid fortification of the food supply and neural tube defect prevention.

Awards and honors
He received a Presidential Early Career Award for Scientists and Engineers from President Bill Clinton in 1996. The American Association for the Advancement of Science elected him as a fellow in 2014. He served as president of the American Society for Nutrition from 2015 to 2016. In 2016 he was elected as a member of the National Academy of Sciences.

Personal life
He is married to Denise Stover; the Stovers have four children, all of whom attended Cornell University.

References

Living people
1964 births
American nutritionists
Scientists from Pennsylvania
Saint Joseph's University alumni
Cornell University faculty
Texas A&M University faculty
Members of the United States National Academy of Sciences
Fellows of the American Association for the Advancement of Science
Annual Reviews (publisher) editors